Icaricia acmon, the Acmon blue, is a North American butterfly. It ranges mainly in California but can be seen north to Oregon and south through Baja California. 

Wingspan is 17-30 mm. The tops of the wings are blue with dark edges in males and brown in females. Its underside is white with black spots for both sexes with a red-orange band on the hindwing. Caterpillars are yellow with white hairs and a green stripe down the back.

Adults feed on nectar while caterpillars can feed on deerweed, buckwheats, lupines, trefoils, and milkvetches.

Like many other lycaenid butterflies, it has a mutualistic relationship with ants, who protect Acmon blue larvae in exchange for honeydew that the larvae secrete.

References

External links
Butterflies and Moths of North America - Acmon Blue
Neartica.com - Acmon Blue

Butterflies of North America
Icaricia
Butterflies described in 1851